The Nuwara Eliya Golf Club is one of the oldest Golf Clubs in Sri Lanka. Established in the late 19th century, it is located in the hill station of Nuwara Eliya. It is an 18-hole golf course.

History
The Nuwara Eliya golf course was constructed in 1889 by a Scottish soldier of the Gordon Highlanders for the British servicemen and officials who were posted at Nuwara Eliya. The course opened in 1890 with nine holes and was upgraded and expanded to eighteen holes in 1893. In 1892 a golf pavilion, consisting of five rooms was constructed, overlooking the links.

It is an 18-hole, Par 70 layout – the scorecard is in metres however the distance from the yardage markers to the edge of the green are measured in yards.

The golf club currently has over 2,000 members.

See also
List of Sri Lankan gentlemen's clubs
Royal Colombo Golf Club

References

Further reading 

 

Nuwara Eliya
Golf clubs and courses in Sri Lanka
Sports venues completed in 1889
Sports venues in Central Province, Sri Lanka
Gentlemen's clubs in Sri Lanka
1889 establishments in Ceylon